The Toleman TG185 was a Formula One racing car designed by Rory Byrne for use by the Toleman team in the 1985 Formula One World Championship.

Background 
After a successful  season, Toleman entered 1985 with Swede Stefan Johansson and John Watson signed as drivers, but without a main sponsor or a tyre contract. The team had switched from Pirelli to Michelin during 1984 following a dispute with the Italian supplier, only for the French company to withdraw from F1 at the end of the year. Pirelli were reluctant to supply the team again, as were Goodyear. Hence, Toleman did not compete in the first three races of 1985, during which Johansson was released from his contract to replace René Arnoux at Ferrari.

Only when Benetton stepped in as main sponsor were the team able to compete, as the Italian clothing company bought the struggling Spirit team's Pirelli tyre contract.

Design 
The car was largely similar to the previous year's TG184, apart from a revised suspension to deal with running different rubber and revised rear bodywork. The car was powered by the  Hart 415T straight-4 turbocharged engine.

Racing history 
The TG185 made its debut at the Monaco Grand Prix.

From the Austrian Grand Prix onwards, a second car was entered for another Italian driver, Piercarlo Ghinzani, who joined the team from Osella.

Fabi gave Toleman its first and only pole position at the German Grand Prix, held at the new Nürburgring. This was to be the team's only highlight of 1985, as the TG185 was otherwise unreliable and saw the finish line just twice all year, when Fabi finished 14th in France and 12th in Italy.

Aftermath 
The TG185 was the last Toleman car, as the team was bought out by Benetton and renamed Benetton Formula ahead of the  season.

One TG185 remains fully operational as of 2018, having been rebuilt during 2016 by Tour-De-Force Power Engineering. It is often seen in historic F1 demonstrations in the UK and Europe. It retains the original Hart 415T engine and Hewland derived gearbox.

Complete Formula One results
(key) (Results shown in bold indicate pole position)

References

1985 Formula One season cars
Toleman Formula One cars